Ettelbruck is a commune with town status in central Luxembourg, with a population of  inhabitants.

History
Until 1850, both Erpeldange and Schieren were part of the Ettelbruck commune as well, but both towns were detached from Ettelbruck by law on 1 July 1850.

Nazi Germany occupied Ettelbruck on 10 May 1940.

US forces first liberated the town on 11 September 1944 but Germany retook the town on 16 December 1944 during the Battle of the Bulge. US General George S. Patton on Christmas Day, 25 December 1944, led US troops in the final liberation of Ettelbruck from Nazi occupation. One of Ettelbruck's main squares is named Patton Square, and is located at the exact spot where the German offensive into Luxembourg's Alzette Valley was stopped, ending its attempt to reoccupy the country as a whole. From 1954 to 2004, the town held a Remembrance Day celebration each July honoring General Patton and the US, British, French, Belgian and Luxembourgish troops who fought with him there.

Population

Government

Ettelbruck is one of the 12 communes of the canton of Diekirch, which is part of the district of Diekirch. Governmentally, the Ettelbruck communal council serves as the commune's local council. The council consists of thirteen members, elected every six years.

Transportation
Ettelbruck lies at the exact spot where three rivers meet: the Sauer, the Wark and the Alzette. This location has historically made Ettelbruck a major transportation hub for the country second only to the city of Luxembourg.

Ettelbruck serves as a junction, where the line to Diekirch branches off the main line Luxembourg – Liège. The station is on Line 10, which connects Luxembourg City to central and northern Luxembourg towards Gouvy and Wiltz, with a branch line connecting to Diekirch.

The A7 motorway, known as the Motorway of the North, is connected to Ettelbruck via the trunk road B7 which runs along the east of Ettelbruck. The B7 junction is bordering Schieren. The other main access routes are the national roads N15 Rue de Bastogne, and the N7 that crosses Ettelbruck north to south.

Attractions

The General George S. Patton Memorial Museum in Ettelbruck honors the general who liberated the town. The museum exhibits photographs, uniforms (both military and prison camp), weapons and documents from the period of German occupation of Luxembourg (May 1940 to September 1944). It also displays helmets, plane engines and a cast of the Patton statue of West Point. The museum was opened on 7 July 1995 and represents a main tourist attraction in the town. It was renovated in 2014 and now features a large graffiti. 

The Ettelbruck parish church—D' Kierch Ettelbréck—is a decagonal structure. Restored in 1849, the church contains tombstones dating as far back to the 15th century.

Sport
Ettelbruck since 1917 has been the home of the football team FC Etzella Ettelbruck. The team plays in Ettelbruck's football stadium Stade Am Deich which has capacity of about 2,000.

Health
Ettelbruck is a medical center for northern Luxembourg, as it is home to the Central Hospice (founded in 1855) which is now the location of the Ettelbruck Neuro-Psychiatric Hospital (in French, CHNP = Centre Hospitalier Neuro-Psychiatrique) with approximately 500 beds. Lucien Wercollier's marble sculpture La Vague ("The Wave") is located in Ettelbruck on the grounds of the CHNP.

The Centre Hospital du Nord (CHdN) Ettelbruck was renovated and reopened as a state of the art medical facility in 2003 on the site of the earlier Charles Marx Clinic and Saint Louis Clinic. The original clinic was founded by Dr. Charles Marx in 1936. The Saint Louis Clinic became a point of resistance preceding the Nazi occupation, when its founder Charles Marx treated downed French airmen (including the future general Marcel-Pierre Faure) in April, 1940. Following the occupation of Luxembourg, Marx fled to France. Following the Nazi occupation, Marx was arrested and jailed for treating the airmen. In 1946, following liberation and Marx's accidental death in that year, the clinic was renamed as the Charles Marx Clinic to honor him. In 1963, the clinic was renamed the New Saint Louis Clinic when it was revamped and modernized, becoming the New Saint Louis Hospital in 2003. In 2010 the former Hôpital Saint-Louis merged with the Clinique Saint-Joseph in Wiltz to form the Centre Hospital du Nord.

Education
Ettelbruck is an educational center for the north of the country. It is home to the St. Anne Girls' Boarding School, founded in 1852 and located between Rue du Canal and Grand-Rue. Parts of the State Agricultural School (LTA), founded in 1883, are still in the Avenue Lucien Salentiny leading to Warken. The main structures have moved in 2021 to a newly build campus in Gilsdorf, above the Diekirch sports centre. The Avenue Lucien Salentiny is also home to the Lycée Technique d'Ettelbruck (LTEtt) which was founded as a vocational school in 1969.

Ons Heemecht
Ons Heemecht ("Our Homeland"), the national anthem of Luxembourg, was first sung publicly in Ettelbruck on 5 June 1864. Both the Alzette and Sauer rivers are named in the song, and since Ettelbruck is located at the point where they both meet, the location was appropriate for its public introduction.

Notable Ettelbruckers

 Charles Marx (1903–1946), physician and World War II resistance leader
 Pierre Joris (born 1946), a Luxembourg-American poet, translator, anthologist and essayist; raised in Ettelbruck
 Monique Melsen (born 1951), a Luxembourgian singer
 Professor François Diederich (born 1952), a Luxembourgian chemist specializing in organic chemistry.
 Bady Minck, a filmmaker, film producer and artist

 Sport
 Erny Putz (1917–1995), a Luxembourgian fencer, competed at the 1948 Summer Olympics
 Eddi Gutenkauf (born 1928), a Luxembourgian fencer, competed at the 1960 Summer Olympics
 Erny Schweitzer (born 1939), a Luxembourgian former swimmer, competed at the 1960 Summer Olympics
 Ni Xialian (born 1963), a female Chinese-born table tennis player who resides in Ettelbruck
 Luc Holtz (born 1969), a former Luxembourgish football player, manager of the Luxembourg national football team.
 Yves Clausse (born 1969), a Luxembourgian swimmer, competed at the 1988 and 1992 Summer Olympics
 Daniel da Mota (born 1985), a Luxembourgish footballer, over 350 pro games and 91 for the national side
 Laurent Carnol (born 1989), a Luxembourgish breaststroke swimmer, competed in the 2008 2012 and 2016 Summer Olympics

 Politicians
 Ernest Mühlen (1926–2014), a Luxembourgish politician, economist and financial journalist
 Lucien Weiler (born 1951), a Luxembourgian politician and jurist
 Charles Goerens (born 1952), a Luxembourgish politician and MEP
 Marco Schank (born 1954), a Luxembourgian politician
 Carole Dieschbourg (born 1977), a Luxembourg politician and writer

References

External links

 http://www.patton.lu
 http://homepage.internet.lu/marc.hirt/info/ettelbruck.htm
 https://web.archive.org/web/20120206211353/http://www.luxembourg.co.uk/NMMH/patton.html
 http://www.ettelbruck.lu/fr/accueil In French
 

 
Cities in Luxembourg
Communes in Diekirch (canton)
Towns in Luxembourg
Alzette